The 2006 WNBA All-Star Game was played on July 12, 2006 at Madison Square Garden in New York, New York, home of the New York Liberty. The game was the 7th annual WNBA All-Star Game. This was the third time New York has hosted the basketball showcase, after previously hosting the 1999 and 2003 games.

The All-Star Game

Rosters

1 Injured
2 Injury replacement
3 Starting in place of injured player

Coaches
The coach for the Western Conference was Sacramento Monarchs coach John Whisenant. The coach for the Eastern Conference was Connecticut Sun coach Mike Thibault.

Other events

Three-Point Shootout
The inaugural Three-Point Shootout was held before the All-Star Game. Contestants shot 25 balls from 5 locations around the three-point line, with each shot counting for one point except for one "money ball" on each rack counting for two points.

Skills Challenge

References

Wnba All-star Game, 2006
Women's National Basketball Association All-Star Game